Yui Kamiji and Jordanne Whiley defeated the defending champions Diede de Groot and Aniek van Koot in the final, 6–2, 6–4 to win the women's doubles wheelchair tennis title at the 2020 Australian Open. It was their third Australian Open title as a pair, and Kamiji's fifth title in doubles (alongside two titles won with Marjolein Buis).

Seeds

Draw

Bracket

References

External links
 Drawsheet on ausopen.com

Wheelchair Women's Doubles
2020 Women's Doubles